Imtiaz Ali may refer to:

Imtiaz Ali (cricketer) (born 1954), West Indian Test cricketer
Imtiaz Ali (1990s cricketer), Trinidadian cricketer
Imtiaz Ali (director) (born 1971), Indian film director and writer